Horse Cock Phepner is the third studio album by American experimental rock band Sun City Girls, released in 1987 by Placebo Records.

Track listing

Personnel
Adapted from the Horse Cock Phepner liner notes.
Sun City Girls
 Alan Bishop – bass guitar, vocals
 Richard Bishop – guitar, vocals
 Charles Gocher – drums, percussion, vocals

Release history

See also
Ronald Reagan in music

References

External links 
 

1987 albums
Sun City Girls albums